Krithodeophyton is a genus of lower Devonian plant with branching axes. It is considered to be a barinophyte.

Phylogeny
The phylogenetic position of the barinophytes remains disputed. Kenrick and Crane in 1997 called the group the Barinophytaceae and placed it in their Sawdoniales, well nested within the zosterophylls. Taylor et al. in 2009 considered the barinophytes to be possible lycopsids rather than zosterophylls. Hao and Xue in 2013 suggested that they were not lycopsids, instead falling between this group and the euphyllophytes.

References

Early Devonian plants
Prehistoric plant genera